The Bayer designation Psi Cancri (ψ Cnc, ψ Cancri) is shared by two star systems, separated by 0.34° on the sky, in the constellation Cancer:

 ψ¹ Cancri
 ψ² Cancri, which is often referred to solely as ψ Cancri

Cancer (constellation)
Cancri, Psi